Gabrielle Beaumont (7 April 1942 – 8 October 2022) was a British film and television director.

Her directing credits range from Hill Street Blues to Star Trek: The Next Generation. She became the first woman to direct an episode of Star Trek, with the episode "Booby Trap". Beaumont lobbied to have Joan Collins cast as Alexis Colby in Dynasty.

Beaumont was best known for directing, writing and producing the television special Diana: A Tribute to the People's Princess. She directed a film version of Bernard Taylor's The Godsend.

Daphne du Maurier was her cousin.

Beaumont died at her home in Fornalutx on 8 October 2022, at the age of 80.

Selected filmography 
Sources:
 Diana: A Tribute to the People's Princess
 Beastmaster III: The Eye of Braxus
 The Other Woman
 Moment of Truth: Cradle of Conspiracy
 Fatal Inheritance
 Riders
 Star Trek: The Next Generation
 L.A. Law
 He's My Girl
 Hill Street Blues
 Gone Are the Dayes
 Secrets of a Mother and Daughter
 Dynasty
 Death of a Centerfold: The Dorothy Stratten Story
 M*A*S*H
 The Waltons
 The Godsend

References

External links

1942 births
2022 deaths
English expatriates in the United States
English expatriates in Spain
English women film directors
English television directors
British women television directors
Film directors from London